Indonesia national under-17 football team represents Indonesia in international football competitions such as FIFA U-17 World Cup , AFC U-17 Asian Cup, AFF U-16 Championship, and any other under-17 international football tournaments. It is controlled by the Football Association of Indonesia (PSSI).

Coaches
As of 10 January 2020

Players
The following 23 players were called up for the 2023 AFC U-17 Asian Cup qualification.

Caps and goals are corrected as of 10 October 2022 against .

Results
Matches in last 12 months, as well as any future scheduled matches

2022

Tournament record

FIFA U-17 World Cup

AFC U-17 Asian Cup

AFF U-16 Youth Championship

Exhibition

Honours

Continental
AFC U-17 Asian Cup
Fourth place: 1990

Regional
AFF U-16 Youth Championship
Champions (2): 2018, 2022
Runners-up: 2013
Third place: 2002, 2019
Fourth place: 2007, 2010

Exhibition tournaments
HKFA International Youth Football Invitation Tournament
Champions (1): 2012
Tien Phong Plastic Cup Tournament
Champions (1): 2017
JENESYS Japan-ASEAN U-16 Youth Football Tournament
Champions (1): 2018

See also
 Indonesia national football team
 Indonesia national under-23 football team
 Indonesia national under-21 football team
 Indonesia national under-20 football team

Notes

References

External links
  The official Indonesian football association website

under-17
Asian national under-17 association football teams